Mary Webb (born 1939) is a British abstract artist.

Biography
Webb was born in London in 1939. She studied Fine Art at Newcastle University under British artists Richard Hamilton and Victor Pasmore from 1958-63. She went on to study at the Chelsea College of Arts, London and taught painting at the Norwich School of Art and Harrogate School of Art. Webb met Sonia Delaunay in Paris during the 1960s and cites her as an influence.

Webb’s paintings and prints are consistently square in shape and exist as an arrangement of vivid squares and rectangles. Her work is held by several public art collections, including the Arts Council Collection, Sainsbury Centre (UEA), Kettle’s Yard, and The Sonia Delaunay Collection (Paris). A one-person survey show of her work was held at the Sainsbury Centre for Visual Arts in 2011 which then toured to the Hatton Gallery, Newcastle University in 2012. Titled ‘Mary Webb: Journeys in Colour’, it contained more than 60 paintings, along with screen prints, drawings and collages including a series of paintings that were inspired by time she spent in Utah.

Exhibitions 
2011 - Journeys In Colour, Sainsbury Centre for Visual Arts, University of East Anglia, Norwich, England 
2012 - Journeys In Colour, Hatton Gallery, Newcastle University, England
2013 - East Contemporary Art; A Collection of 21st Century Practice, UCS Waterfront Gallery, Ipswich, England
2013 - 2013 Women Collectors, Women Artists, Lloyds Club, London
2015 - Small is Beautiful: Flowers Gallery, London
2018 - Visible Women, Norwich Castle Museum, Norwich, UK  
2018 - Reverie, Hales Gallery, London, UK

Publications 
Grieve, A & Clark, M  (2011) Mary Webb: Journeys in Colour. Norwich, University of East Anglia: Sainsbury Centre for Visual Arts

References

External links
 Contemporary British Painting

1942 births
Living people
20th-century British painters
21st-century British painters
British abstract artists
Alumni of Chelsea College of Arts
Alumni of Newcastle University
Artists from London
20th-century British women artists
21st-century British women artists